This list of the prehistoric life of New Mexico contains the various prehistoric life-forms whose fossilized remains have been reported from within the US state of New Mexico.

Precambrian
The Paleobiology Database records no known occurrences of Precambrian fossils in New Mexico.

Paleozoic

 †Actinoceras
  †Adelophthalmus
 †Aenigmacaris
 †Aerosaurus – type locality for genus
 †Aerosaurus wellesi – type locality for species
 †Agassizodus
 †Amphiscapha
 †Ananias
 †Anconastes – type locality for genus
 †Anconastes vesperus – type locality for species
  †Annularia
 †Annularia radiata
 †Annularia sphenophylloides
 †Anomphalus
 †Aphlebia
 †Archaeocidaris
 Archaeolithophyllum
 †Archeria
 †Armenoceras
 †Aspidosaurus
 †Athyris
 †Athyris lamellosa
  †Aviculopecten
 †Aviculopecten arctisulcatus
 †Aviculopecten basilicus
 †Aviculopecten coryeanus – type locality for species
 †Aviculopecten moorei – or unidentified comparable form
 †Baldwinonus – type locality for genus
 †Bellerophon
 †Bellerophon graphicus
 †Bourbonnella – or unidentified comparable form
 †Brachyphyllum
  †Calamites
 †Calamites cistii
 †Callipteris
 †Callipteris conferta
 †Callipteris lyratifolia
 †Caninia
 †Cardiocarpus
 †Catenipora
  †Chenoprosopus – type locality for genus
 †Chenoprosopus milleri – type locality for species
 †Chonetes
 †Chonetes illinoisensis
 †Chonetes mesoloba
 †Cleiothyridina
 †Cleiothyridina hirsuta
 †Cleiothyridina pilularis
 †Collemataria
  †Composita
 †Composita affinis
 †Composita bucculenta
 †Composita cracens
 †Composita emarginata
 †Composita ovata
 †Composita subtilita
 †Conjunctio – type locality for genus
 †Conjunctio multidens – type locality for species
 †Cordaites
 †Crania
 †Ctenacanthus – or unidentified comparable form
  †Cyclopteris
 †Cypricardinia
 †Cyptendoceras – tentative report
 †Cystodictya
 †Cystothalamia
 †Cystothalamia nodulifera
 †Dakeoceras
 †Desmatodon
 †Diadectes
  †Dimetrodon
 †Dimetrodon occidentalis – type locality for species
 †Diplocaulus
 †Domatoceras
 †Earlandia
 †Echinaria
  †Edaphosaurus
 †Edaphosaurus novomexicanus – type locality for species
 †Edmondia
  †Eldredgeops
 †Eldredgeops rana
 †Ellesmeroceras
 †Endorioceras – type locality for genus
 Eocaudina
 †Error
 †Eryops
 †Euomphalus
 †Fenestella
 †Fusulina
 †Girvanella
 †Glenopteris – or unidentified comparable form
  †Glikmanius
 †Glikmanius occidentalis
  †Gnathorhiza
 †Grewingkia
 †Guadalupia
 †Hedstroemia
 †Hexagonaria
 †Isogramma
 †Komia
 †Lambeoceras
 †Lepidodendron
  †Limnoscelis
 †Limnoscelis paludis
 †Lingula
 †Lioestheria – or unidentified comparable form
 †Liroceras
 Lithophaga
 †Lloydia
 † Madera – type locality for genus
 †Mariceras
 †Martinia
 †Metabaltoceras
 †Metacoceras
  †Metalegoceras
 †Murchisonia
 †Naticopsis
 †Naticopsis judithae – or unidentified related form
 †Naticopsis scintilla
  †Neospirifer
 †Neospirifer cameratus
 †Neospirifer dunbari – or unidentified comparable form
 †Neospirifer goreii
 †Neospirifer latus – or unidentified comparable form
 †Neospirifer triplicatus
 †Neuropteris
 †Neuropteris ovata
 †Neuropteris scheuchzeri
 †Nitosaurus – type locality for genus
 Nucula – report made of unidentified related form or using admittedly obsolete nomenclature
 †Oedaleops – type locality for genus
 †Oedaleops campi – type locality for species
 †Onchiodon – tentative report
  †Ophiacodon – type locality for genus
 †Ophiacodon mirus – type locality for species
 †Ophiacodon navajovicus – type locality for species
 †Ozarkodina
 †Pachyphyllum
 †Palmatolepis
 †Paraceltites
 †Paraschwagerina
  †Pecopteris
 †Pecopteris feminaeformis
 †Pentremites
 †Petalodus
 †Phillipsia
 †Plaesiomys
  †Platyhystrix
 †Platyhystrix rugosus
 †Platystrophia
 †Plicochonetes – tentative report
 †Polygnathus
 †Posidonia – tentative report
 †Prodentalium
 †Rhiodenticulatus – type locality for genus
 †Rhiodenticulatus heatoni – type locality for species
  †Rhynchonella – report made of unidentified related form or using admittedly obsolete nomenclature
 †Rioceras – type locality for genus
 †Ruthiromia – type locality for genus
 †Ruthiromia elcobriensis – type locality for species
 †Sallya
 †Samaropsis
 †Sandia
 †Schwagerina
  †Sigillaria
 †Sigillaria brardii
 Solemya
 †Solenopora
 †Spathognathodus
  Sphenacodon – type locality for genus
 †Sphenacodon ferox – type locality for species
 †Sphenophyllum
 †Sphenophyllum cuneifolium
 †Sphenopteris
 †Spirifer
 †Spirifer grimesi
 †Spirifer rockymontanus
 Spirorbis
 †Stearoceras
  †Stethacanthus
 †Streptognathodus
 †Strophomena
 †Strophomena neglecta
 †Syringopora
 †Tainoceras
 †Tetrataxis
 Textularia
 †Trimerorhachis
 †Walchia
 †Wilkingia
 †Worthenia
  †Zatrachys
 †Zia

Mesozoic

 †Acanthoceras
 †Acanthoceras amphibolum
 Acipenser
 †Adocus
 †Ahshislepelta – type locality for genus
 †Ahshislepelta minor – type locality for species
  †Alamosaurus – type locality for genus
 †Alamosaurus sanjuanensis – type locality for species
 †Albanerpeton
 †Albanerpeton nexuosus
 †Albertosaurus – tentative report
 †Allocrioceras
  †Allosaurus
  †Alphadon
 †Alphadon halleyi
 †Alphadon marshi
 †Amblydactylus
 Amia
 †Anasazisaurus – type locality for genus
 †Anasazisaurus horneri – type locality for species
 Anatina
 †Anchisauripus
  †Angistorhinus
 †Anisoceras
 †Ankylosaurus – tentative report
 †Anomia
 †Anomoepus – tentative report
 †Anomotodon
 †Apachesaurus
 †Apachesaurus gregorii
 †Apachesuchus – type locality for genus
 †Apatopus
  †Apatosaurus
 †Araucarioxylon
  †Araucarioxylon arizonicum
 †Arganodus
 †Arganodus dorotheae
 †Arizonasaurus
 †Arizonasaurus babbitti
 †Asplenium
 Astarte
  †Baculites
 †Baculites asper
 †Baculites asperiformis – or unidentified comparable form
 †Baculites codyensis
 †Baculites gregoryensis
 †Baculites haresi
 †Baculites maclearni
 †Baculites obtusus – or unidentified comparable form
 †Baculites perplexus
 †Baculites pseudovatus
 †Baculites rugosus
 †Baculites scotti – or unidentified related form
 †Baculites thomi
 †Baculites yokoyamai
 †Baiera
  †Basilemys
 †Basilemys gaffneyi – type locality for species
  †Bistahieversor
 †Bistahieversor sealeyi
 †Brachychampsa
 †Brachychampsa montana
 †Brachychampsa sealeyi – type locality for species
 †Brachyphyllum
 †Buettneria
 Cadulus
 Callianassa
 Calliostoma
  †Calycoceras
 †Calyptosuchus – type locality for genus
 †Calyptosuchus wellesi – type locality for species
  †Camarasaurus
 †Camarasaurus grandis
 † Canna – tentative report
 †Caririchnium
 Carota
 Carya
 Caryophyllia
 †Caseosaurus – or unidentified comparable form
 †Ceratops
 Cercidiphyllum
 Cerithiopsis
 †Chedighaii hutchisoni – type locality for species
 Chiloscyllium
 †Chindesaurus
 †Chindesaurus bryansmalli
  †Chinlea
 †Chirotherium
 †Cibolaites
 †Cimolestes – or unidentified comparable form
 †Cimolodon
 †Cimolodon electus
  †Cimolomys
 Cinnamomum
 Cissus
 Cladophlebis
 †Coelodus
  †Coelophysis
 †Coelophysis bauri – type locality for species
 †Coelosaurus
 †Coelosaurus antiquus
 †Coelurosaurichnus
 †Coilopoceras
 †Coilopoceras colleti
 †Coilopoceras inflatum – type locality for species
 †Coilopoceras springeri
  †Collignoniceras
 †Collignoniceras woollgari
 †Compsemys
 †Coniophis
 †Conlinoceras
 †Continuoolithus
 Corbula
 Crassostrea
 †Cretolamna
 †Cretolamna appendiculata
 †Crosbysaurus
 †Crosbysaurus harrisae
 Cucullaea
 †Cunningtoniceras
 †Cymatoceras
  †Daemonosaurus – type locality for genus
 †Daemonosaurus chauliodus – type locality for species
 †Daspletosaurus
 †Deinodon
 †Deinodon horridus
  †Deinosuchus
 †Deinosuchus rugosus
 †Denazinemys
 †Denazinemys nodosa – type locality for species
 †Denazinosuchus
 †Denazinosuchus kirtlandicus
 Dentalium
  †Desmatosuchus
 †Desmatosuchus haplocerus
 †Desmatosuchus spurensis
 †Desmoceras
 †Desmoceras bassleri
 †Desmoceras erdmanni
 †Didymoceras
 †Didymoceras cheyennense
 †Didymoceras nebrascense
  †Diplodocus
 †Diplodocus carnegii
 †Diplodocus hallorum
 †Dolabrosaurus – type locality for genus
 †Dolabrosaurus aquatilis – type locality for species
  †Doswellia
 †Doswellia sixmilensis – type locality for species
  †Drepanosaurus
 †Dromomeron – type locality for genus
 †Dromomeron romeri – type locality for species
 †Durania
  †Effigia – type locality for genus
 †Effigia okeeffeae – type locality for species
 †Enchodus
 †Eodelphis – or unidentified comparable form
  †Eopelobates – tentative report
 †Essonodon
 †Essonodon browni
 †Eubostrychoceras
 †Eucalycoceras
 †Eucoelophysis – type locality for genus
 †Eucoelophysis baldwini – type locality for species
 †Euomphaloceras
 †Euspira
 †Eutrephoceras
 †Exiteloceras
  †Exogyra
 †Exogyra acroumbonata – or unidentified related form
 †Exogyra clarki
 †Exogyra levis
 †Exogyra trigeri
 †Exogyra whitneyi
 †Fagesia
 †Fagesia superstes
 Fasciolaria – tentative report
 Ficus
 Gerrhonotus – or unidentified comparable form
 Glossus – report made of unidentified related form or using admittedly obsolete nomenclature
 †Glyptodontopelta – type locality for genus
 †Glyptodontopelta mimus – type locality for species
  †Glyptops
 †Gojirasaurus – type locality for genus
 †Gojirasaurus quayi – type locality for species
 †Grallator
 †Hemicalypterus
 †Herrickiceras
  †Hesperosuchus
 †Hoplitoides
 †Hoplitoides koeneni – or unidentified comparable form
 †Hoplitoides sandovalensis – type locality for species
 †Hoplitoides wohltmanni – or unidentified comparable form
 †Hoploscaphites
 †Hoploscaphites gilli
 †Hoploscaphites nodosus
 †Hybodus
  †Ichthyornis
  †Inoceramus
 †Inoceramus arvanus
 †Inoceramus balticus
 †Inoceramus bellvuensis
 †Inoceramus browni
 †Inoceramus bueltenensis
 †Inoceramus cordiformis
 †Inoceramus cuvieri
 †Inoceramus deformis
 †Inoceramus dimidius
 †Inoceramus grandis
 †Inoceramus howelli
 †Inoceramus incertus
 †Inoceramus labiatoidiformis – or unidentified related form
 †Inoceramus longealatus
 †Inoceramus lundbreckensis
 †Inoceramus lundbrekensis
 †Inoceramus muelleri
 †Inoceramus mytiloidiformis
 †Inoceramus parvus
 †Inoceramus pertenuis – or unidentified related form
 †Inoceramus pictus
 †Inoceramus proximus – or unidentified related form
 †Inoceramus robertsoni – type locality for species
 †Inoceramus sagensis
 †Inoceramus schloenbachi
 †Inoceramus simpsoni
 †Inoceramus soukupi – or unidentified related form
 †Inoceramus subcompressus
 †Inoceramus turgidus – or unidentified related form
 †Inoceramus undabundus
 †Inoceramus vanuxemi
 †Ischyrhiza
 †Ischyrhiza avonicola
 †Ischyrhiza mira
 †Ischyrhiza schneideri – or unidentified comparable form
 †Isopodichnus
  Isurus
 †Jeyawati – type locality for genus
 †Jeyawati rugoculus – type locality for species
 †Kamerunoceras
 †Kimbetohia – or unidentified comparable form
  †Koskinonodon
 †Kouphichnium
  †Kritosaurus – type locality for genus
 †Kritosaurus navajovius – type locality for species
  Lamna
 Lepisosteus
 †Leptalestes
 †Leptalestes cooki
 †Leptalestes prokrejcii – type locality for species
 Lima
 †Linearis – tentative report
  Linuparus
 †Lissodus
 †Lonchidion
 Lopha
 †Lucianosaurus – type locality for genus
 †Lucianosaurus wildi – type locality for species
 † Lucina
  †Machaeroprosopus
 †Machaeroprosopus bucercos
 †Machaeroprosopus buceros – type locality for species
 †Machaeroprosopus pristinus
 †Magnoavipes
 Magnolia
 †Mammites
 †Mantelliceras
 †Megalosauripus
 †Melvius
 †Melvius chauliodous
  †Meniscoessus
 †Meniscoessus intermedius
 †Menuites
 †Mesodma
 †Mesodma formosa
 †Mesodma senecta
 †Metoicoceras
 †Metoicoceras geslinianum
 †Metoicoceras mosbyense – or unidentified comparable form
 †Modiolus
 †Monoclonius
 †Morrowites
 †Morrowites depressus
 †Morrowites subdepressus – type locality for species
  †Mortoniceras
 †Myledaphus
 †Myledaphus bipartitus
 †Naashoibitosaurus – type locality for genus
 †Naashoibitosaurus ostromi – type locality for species
 †Navajodactylus – type locality for genus
 †Navajodactylus boerei – type locality for species
 †Neithea
 †Neocalamites
 †Neocardioceras
 †Neocardioceras juddii
 †Neoptychites
  Nicaisolopha
 †Nodocephalosaurus – type locality for genus
 †Nodocephalosaurus kirtlandensis – type locality for species
  †Nothronychus – type locality for genus
 †Nothronychus mckinleyi – type locality for species
 Odontaspis
 †Odontaspis cheethami
 †Odontaspis sanguinei – or unidentified comparable form
  †Ojoceratops – type locality for genus
 †Ojoceratops fowleri – type locality for species
 †Ojoraptorsaurus – type locality for genus
 †Ojoraptorsaurus boerei – type locality for species
 †Ophiomorpha
 †Opisthotriton
  †Ornithomimus
 †Ornithomimus edmontonicus
 Ostrea
 †Pachydesmoceras
  †Pagiophyllum
 †Pagiophyllum duttonia
 †Pagiophyllum navajoensis
 †Pagiophyllum newberryi
 †Pagiophyllum readiana
 †Pagiophyllum zuniana
 †Paleopsephurus
 †Paleopsephurus wilsoni
 †Panoplosaurus – tentative report
 †Paracimexomys
 †Paracimexomys judithae
 †Paralbula
  †Parasaurolophus – type locality for genus
 †Parasaurolophus cyrtocristatus – type locality for species
 †Parasaurolophus tubicen – type locality for species
 †Paratypothorax
 †Paronychodon
 †Paronychodon lacustris
 †Parrishia
  †Pentaceratops – type locality for genus
 †Pentaceratops sternbergii – type locality for species
 Pholadomya
 †Pinna
 †Placenticeras
 †Placenticeras cumminsi
 †Placenticeras meeki
 †Placenticeras pseudoplacenta
 †Planolites
 Platanus
  †Platecarpus – or unidentified comparable form
  †Platyceramus
 †Platyceramus cycloides
 †Platyceramus ezoensis - or unidentified loosely related form
 †Platyceramus heinei
 †Platyceramus mantelli - or unidentified loosely related form
 †Platyceramus platinus
 Plicatula
 †Porituberoolithus
 †Postosuchus
 †Prenocephale
 †Prismatoolithus
 †Prodesmodon
  †Proganochelys – type locality for genus
 †Protocardia
 †Pseudocorax
 †Pseudoegertonia – or unidentified comparable form
 †Pseudoperna
 †Pseudoperna congesta
 †Pseudotetrasauropus
 †Pterotrigonia
  †Ptychodus
 †Ptychodus anonymus
 †Ptychodus polygyrus
 †Ptychodus whipplei
 †Ptychotrygon
 †Ptychotrygon blainensis
 †Ptychotrygon boothi
 †Ptychotrygon triangularis
 Pycnodonte
 †Pycnodonte kellumi
 †Pycnodonte newberryi
 Quercus – or unidentified comparable form
  †Redondasaurus – type locality for genus
 †Redondasaurus bermani – type locality for species
 †Redondasaurus gregorii – type locality for species
 †Redondasuchus – type locality for genus
 †Redondavenator – type locality for genus
 †Redondavenator quayensis – type locality for species
  †Revueltosaurus – type locality for genus
 †Revueltosaurus callenderi – type locality for species
 †Rhamnus
 †Richardoestesia
 †Richardoestesia isosceles – or unidentified comparable form
 †Rioarribasuchus
 †Rioarribasuchus chamaensis – type locality for species
 †Romaniceras
 †Rutiodon
  Sabal
 Salix
 †Salvinia
 †Samaropsis
 †Samaropsis bigelowii – type locality for species
 †Samaropsis finchii – type locality for species
 †Samaropsis lamyensis – type locality for species
 †Samaropsis romeri – type locality for species
 †Samaropsis whitensis – type locality for species
 †Saurolophus – tentative report
  †Saurornitholestes
 †Saurornitholestes sullivani – type locality for species
 †Scapanorhynchus
 †Scapanorhynchus rhaphiodon
 †Scaphites
 †Scaphites ferronensis
 †Scaphites hippocrepis
 †Scaphites leei
 †Scaphites rioensis
 †Scaphites warreni
 †Scaphites whitfieldi
 †Scotiophryne
 †Scoyenia
 †Semionotus
  †Sequoia
 Serpula
 †Shuvosaurus
 †Shuvosaurus inexpectatus
 Solemya
 †Sphaerotholus – type locality for genus
 †Sphaerotholus goodwini – type locality for species
 Spirorbis – report made of unidentified related form or using admittedly obsolete nomenclature
 Squalicorax
 †Squalicorax falcatus
 †Squalicorax kaupi
 Squatina
 †Squatirhina
 †Squatirhina americana
  †Stagonolepis
  †Stegoceras – type locality for genus
 †Stegoceras novomexicanum – type locality for species
 †Stegoceras validum
 †Struthiomimus – or unidentified comparable form
 †Struthiomimus altus
  †Tawa – type locality for genus
 †Tawa hallae – type locality for species
 †Tecovasuchus
 †Tecovasuchus chatterjeei
 Tellina
 †Teredina
 †Tetrasauropus – tentative report
 †Thalassinoides
  †Thescelosaurus – tentative report
 †Thoracosaurus – tentative report
 †Titanoceratops – type locality for genus
 †Titanoceratops ouranos – type locality for species
 †Torosaurus
 †Tragodesmoceras
  †Triceratops
 †Trilophosaurus
 †Trilophosaurus jacobsi
 †Triodus
 †Trochactaeon
 †Turrilites
 †Turrilites acutus
 †Turrilites costatus
 Turritella
  †Typothorax – type locality for genus
 †Tyrannosauripus – type locality for genus
 †Tyrannosauripus pillmorei – type locality for species
  †Tyrannosaurus
 †Tyrannosaurus rex
 Unio
  †Vancleavea
 †Vancleavea campi
 †Vascoceras
 †Viburnum
 †Vinella
 †Vivaron – type locality for genus
 †Volviceramus
 †Watinoceras
 †Whitakersaurus – type locality for genus
 †Whitakersaurus bermani – type locality for species
 †Williamsonia
 †Woodwardia – tentative report
 †Xenacanthus – report made of unidentified related form or using admittedly obsolete nomenclature
 Xenophora
 †Zamites
 †Zamites occidentalis
 †Zamites powellii
  †Ziapelta – type locality for genus
 †Ziapelta sanjuanensis – type locality for species
 Zizyphus
  †Zuniceratops – type locality for genus
 †Zuniceratops christopheri – type locality for species

Cenozoic

 Accipiter
 †Acritohippus
 †Acritohippus isonesus
 Aechmophorus
 †Aechmophorus occidentalis
 †Aelurodon
  †Aepycamelus
 Aix
 †Aix sponsa
 †Akanthosuchus – type locality for genus
 †Akanthosuchus langstoni – type locality for species
 †Alforjas
 †Ambystoma
 †Ambystoma tigrinum
 Ammospermophilus
 †Ammospermophilus leucurus – or unidentified comparable form
  †Amphicyon
 †Amphicyon ingens
 †Anabernicula
 Anas
 †Anas acuta
 †Anas carolinensis – tentative report
 †Anas platyrhynchos
 †Anconodon
 †Ankalagon
  †Ankalagon saurognathus
 Antilocapra
 †Antilocapra americana
 Antrozous
 †Antrozous pallidus
 Aphelocoma
 †Aphelocoma coerulescens
  †Aphelops
 Aquila
 †Aquila chrysaetos
 †Archaeohippus
 †Arctocyon
  †Arctodus
 †Arctodus simus
 †Artocarpus
 Asio
 †Asio flammeus
 †Astrohippus
 †Australocamelus
 Aythya
 †Aythya valisineria
  †Aztlanolagus
 †Baena
 Baiomys
 Bassariscus
 †Bassariscus astutus
 †Betonnia – type locality for genus
 Bison
 †Bison antiquus
  †Bison latifrons
 †Blancocamelus
 †Blastomeryx
 †Blastomeryx gemmifer
 †Borealosuchus
 †Borealosuchus acutidentatus
  †Borophagus
 †Borophagus hilli
 †Borophagus secundus
  †Brachycrus
 †Brachyhyops
 †Breagyps
 †Breagyps clarki
 Bubo
 †Bubo virginianus
 Bufo
 †Bufo punctatus
 †Bufo woodhousei
 Burhinus
 Buteo
 †Buteo jamaicensis
 †Buteo lagopus
 †Buteo nitidus
 †Buteo swainsoni
 Callipepla – or unidentified comparable form
  †Camelops
 †Camelops hesternus
 Canis
 †Canis armbrusteri
  †Canis dirus
 †Canis ferox
 †Canis latrans
 †Canis lepophagus
 †Canis lupus
 †Canis rufus
 †Cantius
 †Cantius angulatus
 †Cantius frugivorus
  †Capromeryx
 Caracara
 †Carpocyon
 Castor
 †Castor canadensis
 Cathartes
 †Cathartes aura
 †Catopsalis
 †Catopsalis fissidens
 †Catopsalis foliatus
 Celtis
 †Cephalogale
  †Ceratogaulus
 Cercidiphyllum
 †Cerdocyon
 †Chacomylus – type locality for genus
 †Chacopterygus – type locality for genus
 Chaetodipus
 †Chaetodipus intermedius
 †Chriacus
 Cissus
 Cnemidophorus
 Colaptes
  †Colaptes auratus
 Colinus – tentative report
 †Colinus virginianus
 †Compsemys
 Conepatus
 †Conepatus leuconotus
 †Copecion
 †Copelemur
 †Cophosaurus – tentative report
 †Cophosaurus texanus
 Coragyps
 †Coragyps atratus
 †Coragyps occidentalis
 †Cormohipparion
 Corvus
 †Corvus corax
  †Coryphodon
 †Cosoryx
  †Cranioceras
 Cratogeomys
 †Cratogeomys castanops
 Crotalus
 †Crotalus atrox
 Crotaphytus
 †Crotaphytus collaris
 Cryptotis
 †Cryptotis parva
  †Cuvieronius
 †Cuvieronius tropicus
 Cyanocitta – tentative report
 †Cynarctoides
 †Cynarctoides acridens
 †Cynarctoides gawnae – type locality for species
 †Cynelos
 Cynomys
 †Cynomys gunnisoni
 †Cynomys ludovicianus
 Cyrtonyx – or unidentified comparable form
 †Cyrtonyx montezumae
 †Daphoenodon
 †Desmatippus
 †Desmatochoerus
 †Desmocyon
  Desmodus
 †Desmodus stocki
 †Diacodexis
 †Didymictis
 †Dinohippus
 Dipodomys
 †Dipodomys merriami
 †Dipodomys ordii
 †Dipodomys spectabilis
 †Dipoides
 †Dissacus
 †Dromomeryx
 †Dromomeryx borealis
  †Duchesneodus
 †Echmatemys
 †Ectoconus
 †Ectopistes
 †Ectopistes migratorius
 Elaphe
 †Eoconodon
 †Eoconodon coryphaeus
 †Eoconodon ginibitohia – type locality for species
  †Eohippus
 †Eohippus angustidens
  †Epicyon
 †Epicyon haydeni
 Eptesicus
  †Eptesicus fuscus
 Equus
 †Equus conversidens
 †Equus francisci
 †Equus niobrarensis – or unidentified comparable form
  †Equus scotti
 †Equus simplicidens
 Erethizon
 †Erethizon dorsatum
 †Eucastor
  †Euceratherium
 †Euceratherium collinum
 †Eucommia
 †Eucosmodon
 †Eucosmodon americanus
 †Eucosmodon primus – type locality for species
  †Eucyon
 †Eucyon davisi
 Eutamias
 †Eutamias minimus
 Falco
  †Falco mexicanus
 †Falco peregrinus – tentative report
 †Falco sparverius
 †Falco swarthi
 Ficus
 †Fulica
 †Fulica americana
 †Gaillardia
 †Geococcyx
 †Geococcyx californianus
 Geomys
 †Gigantocamelus
  †Glossotherium – or unidentified comparable form
 Glyptostrobus
  †Glyptotherium
  †Gomphotherium
 †Goniacodon
 Gopherus
 †Gopherus agassizii
 Grus
 †Grus canadensis
 Gymnogyps
 †Gymnogyps californianus
 †Habrosaurus
 †Habrosaurus dilatus
 †Hadrianus
  †Hemiauchenia
 †Hemiauchenia macrocephala
 †Heptodon
 †Hesperotestudo
 †Hippotherium
 Homo
 †Homo sapiens
 †Homogalax – or unidentified comparable form
 †Hoplochelys
  †Hyaenodon
 †Hyaenodon horridus
 †Hydromystria
 †Hyopsodus
  †Hypohippus
 †Hypolagus
 †Hyracodon – or unidentified comparable form
 †Hyracotherium
 †Hyracotherium vasacciense
 †Intyrictis
 †Kimbetohia – type locality for genus
 †Kimbetopsalis – type locality for genus
 †Kimbetopsalis simmonsae – type locality for species
 Kinosternon
 †Kinosternon flavescens
 Lagurus
 Lampropeltis
 †Lampropeltis getulus
 Laurus
  †Leidyosuchus
 Lemmiscus
 †Lemmiscus curtatus
  †Leptocyon
 Lepus
 †Lepus alleni
 †Lepus californicus
 †Lepus townsendii
 †Listrognathosuchus
 †Longirostromeryx
 Lontra
 †Lontra canadensis
 Loxia
  †Loxia curvirostra
 Lynx
 †Lynx lynx
 †Lynx rufus
  Macrocranion
 Magnolia
 †Mammut
 †Mammut americanum
 †Mammut raki – type locality for species
 †Mammuthus
  †Mammuthus columbi
 Marmota
 †Marmota flaviventris
 Martes
 Masticophis
 †Masticophis flagellum – tentative report
 †Megahippus
 †Megalonyx
 †Megalonyx leptostomus
 †Megalonyx wheatleyi
  †Megatylopus
 Meleagris
 †Meleagris gallopavo
 †Meniscotherium
  †Menoceras
 Mephitis
 †Mephitis mephitis
 Mergus – tentative report
 †Merychippus
 †Merychyus
  †Merycodus
 †Mesodma
 †Mesodma thompsoni
 †Metatomarctus
 †Michenia
 †Microsyops
 †Microtomarctus
 Microtus
  †Microtus californicus – or unidentified comparable form
 †Microtus longicaudus
 †Microtus mexicanus
 †Microtus ochrogaster
 †Microtus pennsylvanicus
 †Mimetodon
 †Mimetodon krausei – type locality for species
 †Mithrandir
 Mustela
 †Mustela richardsonii
  †Mustela nigripes
 Myodes
 †Myodes rutilus – or unidentified comparable form
 Myotis
 †Myotis lucifugus – tentative report
 †Myotis thysanodes
 †Myotis velifer
 †Nannippus
 †Navahoceros
 †Navahoceros fricki – type locality for species
 †Navajosuchus – type locality for genus
 †Navajosuchus mooki – type locality for species
  †Neohipparion
 Neophrontops
 †Neophrontops americanus
Neogale
†Neogale frenata – or unidentified comparable form
 †Neoplagiaulax
 †Neoplagiaulax macintyrei – type locality for species
 †Neoplagiaulax macrotomeus
 Neotamias
 †Neotamias dorsalis – tentative report
 Neotoma
 †Neotoma albigula
 †Neotoma cinerea
 †Neotoma lepida
 †Neotoma mexicana
 †Neotoma micropus
 †Neotoma stephensi
  †Nimravides
 †Notharctus
 †Nothrotherium
 Notiosorex
 †Odaxosaurus
 †Odaxosaurus piger
  Odocoileus
 †Odocoileus hemionus
 †Odocoileus virginianus
 Ondatra
 Onychomys
 †Onychomys leucogaster
 †Onychomys torridus
 Oreamnos – or unidentified comparable form
  †Oreamnos harringtoni
 Oreortyx
 †Oreortyx picta
 Oryzomys – or unidentified comparable form
  †Osbornoceros
 †Osbornoceros osborni – type locality for species
 †Osbornodon
 Otus – or unidentified comparable form
 Ovis
 †Ovis canadensis
 †Oxyacodon
 †Oxyaena
 †Oxydactylus
 †Pachyaena
 †Palaeoryctes
 Panthera
  †Panthera onca
 †Pantolambda
 Pappogeomys
 †Paracynarctus
  †Paramylodon
 †Paramylodon harlani – or unidentified comparable form
 †Paramys
 †Paratomarctus
 †Parectypodus
 †Parectypodus trovessartianus
 †Parectypodus vanvaleni – type locality for species
 †Parvitragulus
 †Pelycodus
 †Pelycodus jarrovii
 †Peraceras
 Perognathus
 †Perognathus flavus
 Peromyscus
  †Peromyscus boylii
 †Peromyscus crinitus – or unidentified comparable form
 †Peromyscus difficilis
  †Peromyscus eremicus
 †Peromyscus maniculatus
 †Peromyscus truei
 Persea
 Phalacrocorax
 †Phalacrocorax auritus
  †Phenacodus
 Phenacomys
 †Phenacomys intermedius
 Phrynosoma
 †Phrynosoma cornutum
 †Phrynosoma douglassi
 †Phrynosoma modestum
 Pituophis
 †Pituophis catenifer
 Platanus
  †Platygonus
 †Platygonus compressus
 Plecotus
 †Pleiolama
 †Plesiogulo
 †Pliohippus
 †Pliometanastes
  †Plithocyon
 Podiceps
 †Procamelus
 †Promartes
  †Promerycochoerus
  †Protitanotherium
 †Protohippus
 †Protolabis
 †Protomarctus
 †Psalidocyon
 Pseudacris
 †Pseudacris triseriata
 †Pseudaelurus
 †Pseudhipparion
 †Pseudocyon
 †Pseudoprotoceras
  †Psittacotherium
 †Ptilodus
 †Ptilodus mediaevus
 †Ptilodus tsosiensis – type locality for species
 Puma
 †Puma concolor
 †Ramoceros
 †Rana
 †Rana pipiens
 Reithrodontomys
 †Reithrodontomys megalotis
 †Rhamnus
  †Rhynchotherium
 Sabal
 †Salpinctes – or unidentified comparable form
 †Salpinctes obsoletus
 Salvadora
  †Saniwa
 †Saniwa ensidens
 Scalopus
 Scaphiopus
 †Scaphohippus
 Sceloporus
 †Sceloporus undulatus
 Sciurus
 †Sciurus aberti
 Sigmodon
 †Sigmodon hispidus
 †Sinopa
  †Smilodon
 †Smilodon gracilis
 Sorex
 †Sorex merriami
 Spea
  †Spea bombifrons
 †Spea hammondii
 †Speotyto cunicularia
 Spermophilus
 †Spermophilus lateralis
 †Spermophilus spilosoma
 †Spermophilus tridecemlineatus
 †Spermophilus variegatus
 Spilogale
 †Spilogale putorius
  †Stegomastodon
 †Stegomastodon mirificus
 †Stenomylus
 †Stenomylus gracilis – or unidentified comparable form
 †Stockoceros
 Strix
 †Strix occidentalis – or unidentified comparable form
 Sylvilagus
 †Sylvilagus audubonii
 †Sylvilagus floridanus
 †Sylvilagus nuttallii
 Tadarida
 †Tadarida brasiliensis
  †Taeniolabis
 †Taeniolabis taoensis
 Tamias
  Tapirus
 Taxidea
 †Taxidea taxus
  †Teleoceras
 †Telmatherium
 Terrapene – tentative report
 †Terrapene ornata
 †Tetraclaenodon
 Thamnophis
 †Thamnophis proximus
 Thomomys
 †Thomomys bottae
 †Thomomys talpoides
  †Tomarctus
 †Tomarctus brevirostris
 †Tomarctus hippophaga
 †Triisodon
 †Triisodon quivirensis
 Trionyx
 Tympanuchus
 †Tympanuchus pallidicinctus
 Tyto
 †Tyto alba
 †Uintacyon
 Urocyon
 †Urocyon cinereoargenteus
 †Urosaurus – or unidentified comparable form
 †Urosaurus ornatus
 Ursus
 †Ursus americanus
 †Ustatochoerus
 †Valenia
  †Vulpavus
 Vulpes
 †Vulpes velox
 †Vulpes vulpes
 Xanthocephalus
  †Xanthocephalus xanthocephalus
  †Ysengrinia – or unidentified comparable form
 Zenaida
 †Zenaida macroura
 †Zenaidura
 †Zenaidura macroura

References
 

New Mexico